Hayyim ben Jacob Alfandari (1588 – 1640) was a talmudic educator and writer, teaching at Constantinople in 1618. He was the pupil of Aaron ben Joseph Sason. Some of his responsa were published in the Maggid me-Reshit (He Tells from the Beginning), Constantinople, 1710, which contains also the responsa of his son Isaac Raphael, and which was edited by his grandson Hayyim ben Isaac Raphael. His novellæ on several Talmudic treatises are still extant in manuscript.

Jewish Encyclopedia bibliography
 Azulai, Shem ha-Gedolim, s.v.;
 Michael, Or ha-Ḥayyim, No. 853;
 Steinschneider, Cat. Bodl. No. 4668.

See also
 Alfandari

References

1588 births
1640 deaths
17th-century rabbis from the Ottoman Empire
Rabbis from Istanbul
Writers from Istanbul
Turkish Sephardi Jews
Sephardi rabbis